Rafael López may refer to:

Rafael López Gutiérrez (1855-1924), president of Honduras from 1920 to 1924
Rafael "Red" Lopez (1886-1921), Mexican outlaw and revolutionary
Rafael López (handballer), Spanish Olympic contender
Rafael López (illustrator and artist)
Rafael Lopez (baseball), baseball player

See also
Rafael Lopes (disambiguation)